Huang Suh-chuang (born 11 September 1934) is a Taiwanese sprinter. He competed in the men's 100 metres at the 1960 Summer Olympics.

References

1934 births
Living people
Athletes (track and field) at the 1960 Summer Olympics
Taiwanese male sprinters
Olympic athletes of Taiwan
Place of birth missing (living people)